Chang Feng-hua (born 11 April 1968) is a Taiwanese sprinter. She competed in the women's 400 metres at the 1988 Summer Olympics.

References

1968 births
Living people
Athletes (track and field) at the 1988 Summer Olympics
Taiwanese female sprinters
Taiwanese female hurdlers
Olympic athletes of Taiwan
Place of birth missing (living people)